John Shanley may refer to:

John Shanley (bishop) (1852–1909), American prelate
John P. Shanley (1915–1985), American journalist
John Patrick Shanley (born 1950), American playwright and filmmaker

See also
Shanley (surname)